The 1999 Trans America Athletic Conference baseball tournament was held at Osceola County Stadium in Kissimmee, Florida. This was the twenty-first tournament championship held by the Trans America Athletic Conference.  won their first tournament championship and earned the conference's automatic bid to the 1999 NCAA Division I baseball tournament.

Format and seeding
The top six finishers by conference winning percentage qualified for the tournament, with the top seed playing the lowest seed in the first round.

Bracket

All-Tournament Team
The following players were named to the All-Tournament Team.

Most Valuable Player
Jeff Nebel was named Tournament Most Valuable Player. Nebe was a pitcher for Mercer.

References

Tournament
ASUN Conference Baseball Tournament
Trans America Athletic Conference baseball tournament